Trigonostylops is an extinct genus of South American meridiungulatan ungulate, from the Late Paleocene to Late Eocene (Itaboraian to Tinguirirican in the SALMA classification) of South America (Argentina and Peru) and Antarctica (Seymour Island). It is the only member of the family Trigonostylopidae.

Description 

A complete skull of the type species, T. wortmani, has been found, and it has been classified as an astrapothere based on its large lower incisors.

Phylogeny 
Cladogram based in the phylogenetic analysis published by Vallejo Pareja et al., 2015, showing the position of Trigonostylops:

Distribution 

Fossils of Trigonostylops have been found in:

Paleocene
 Las Flores Formation, Argentina

Eocene
 La Meseta Formation, Antarctica
 Casamayor, Divisadero Largo, Koluel Kaike and Sarmiento Formations, Argentina
 Pozo Formation, Peru

References

Bibliography 
 
 
 
 
 
 

Meridiungulata
Paleocene mammals
Eocene mammals
Paleocene mammals of South America
Eocene mammals of South America
Tinguirirican
Divisaderan
Mustersan
Casamayoran
Riochican
Itaboraian
Paleogene Argentina
Paleogene Peru
Fossils of Argentina
Fossils of Peru
Paleogene animals of Antarctica
Cenozoic mammals of Antarctica
Fossils of Antarctica
Fossil taxa described in 1897
Taxa named by Florentino Ameghino
Prehistoric placental genera
Golfo San Jorge Basin
Sarmiento Formation